Holaday is a surname. Notable people with the surname include

Bryan Holaday (born 1987), American baseball player
Sarah Holaday (died 1754), English silversmith
William P. Holaday (1882–1946), American politician

See also
Holiday (surname)
Holladay